The Théâtre des Bouffes-Parisiens is a Parisian theatre founded in 1855 by the composer Jacques Offenbach for the performance of opéra bouffe and operetta. The current theatre is located in the 2nd arrondissement at 4 rue Monsigny with an entrance at the back at 65 Passage Choiseul. In the 19th century the theatre was often referred to as the Salle Choiseul. With the decline in popularity of operetta after 1870, the theatre expanded its repertory to include comedies.

History

Salle Lacaze 

In February 1855, Offenbach successfully requested a license from the Parisian authorities for the performance of what he described as a "new and original" genre of musical theatre. He justified his proposed endeavour by saying that these works would have mass appeal and would provide opportunities for young French composers.

The company gave its first performances during the summer of 1855 at the Salle Lacaze. This theatre was unusually small with a capacity of only 300 spectators, but was located on the Carré Marigny, near the crowds attending the Exposition Universelle. The inaugural performance was on 5 July with Offenbach conducting four of his own works: a prologue called Entrez, messieurs, mesdames, a one-act pièce d'occasion written by Joseph Méry and "Jules Servières" (a pen name of Ludovic Halévy, who worked as a government official and needed to protect his reputation); Une nuit blanche, a one-act opéra-comique on a pastoral theme; Arlequin barbier, a pantomime utilizing themes from Rossini's Il barbiere di Siviglia arranged by "Alfred Lange" (Offenbach); and Les deux aveugles, a one-act bouffonerie musicale about two swindling "blind" Parisian beggars. The latter was almost cut, since the invited audience who attended the dress rehearsal failed to laugh, but Offenbach decided to retain it, and it was the hit of the opening night. This little piece soon acquired an international reputation (due to visitors from the Exposition), and Offenbach's admirers soon included Tolstoy and Thackeray. Further performances in the summer of 1855 were primarily of satirical sketches which only included a few musical numbers. The season, however, was so successful that Offenbach was able to resign his position as conductor of the Théâtre Français.

Salle Choiseul 

In October Offenbach submitted another petition to the authorities, this time to merge his company with the Théâtre des Jeunes Élèves de Monsieur Comte (Théâtre Comte). This company's theatre, which was not much larger than the Salle Lacaze, was demolished, and the larger Salle Choiseul with a capacity of about 900 was constructed. The new theatre was not only larger, but warmer, more luxurious and more comfortable than the Salle Lacaze. The orchestra was enlarged from sixteen players to thirty. Offenbach's new license permitted performances of one-act comedies, with or without music, but with fewer than five characters. It also specifically excluded sketches and required the performance of at least two works by composers other than Offenbach. The first performance of the merged company was on 29 December 1855 at the Salle Choiseul and included the premiere of Offenbach's Ba-ta-clan, a one-act chinoiserie musicale with a libretto by Halévy. From this time performances were primarily given at the Salle Choiseul during the winter theatre season. The company performed at the Salle Lacaze during the 1856, 1857 and 1859 summer seasons, however, in March 1861 legislation was enacted which prevented the company from using both theatres, and appearances at the Salle Lacaze were discontinued. In spite of the restrictions of the license, Offenbach began including longer, more substantial works which violated its terms. For instance, his two-act Orphée aux enfers with a cast of 16 received its first performance at the Salle Choiseul on 21 October 1858. Even after Offenbach resigned as the director in January 1862, the company continued at the Salle Choiseul, performing light operas by other composers as well as Offenbach.

Upon the departure of Offenbach, the new director tore down the existing hall to erect a larger one with a capacity of 1100 spectators.

Legacy 
While the Théâtre des Bouffes-Parisiens is indelibly linked to Offenbach, it has also been the venue for a number of other important works. In addition to Offenbach's own operettas, the theatre has seen the premieres of musical works by Hervé, Emmanuel Chabrier and Claude Terrasse and playwrights such as Robert de Flers, Albert Willemetz, Sacha Guitry and Henri Bernstein.

From 1986 to 2007, the Théâtre des Bouffes-Parisiens was under the directorship of Jean-Claude Brialy, who died of cancer in May 2007.

List of premieres

List of directors
The Théâtre des Bouffes-Parisiens was founded as a private entrepreneurship.

References
Notes

Sources
Dickens, Charles (1882). Dicken's Dictionary of Paris, 1882. An Unconventional Handbook. London: Macmillan. View at Google Books.
Faris, Alexander (1980). Jacques Offenbach. London & Boston: Faber and Faber. .
Fauser, Annegret, editor; Everist, Mark, editor (2009). Music, theater, and cultural transfer. Paris, 1830–1914. Chicago: The University of Chicago Press. .
Galignani, A. and W., publishers (1862). Galignani's New Paris Guide for 1862. Paris: A. and W. Galignani. View at Google Books.
Gammond, Peter (1980). Offenbach. London: Omnibus Press. .
Gänzl, Kurt (2001). The Encyclopedia of the Musical Theatre, second edition. New York: Schirmer Books. .
Levin, Alicia (2009). "A documentary overview of musical theaters in Paris, 1830–1900" in Fauser 2009, pp. 379–402.
Martin, Jules (1901). Nos Artistes: Annuaire des Théâtres et Concerts, 1901–1902. Paris: Ollendorff.  View at Google Books.
Sadie, Stanley, editor (1992). The New Grove Dictionary of Opera (4 volumes). London: Macmillan. .
Wagstaff, John (1992). "Véronique" in Sadie 1992, vol. 4, pp. 961–962.
Yon, Jean-Claude (2000). Jacques Offenbach. [Paris]: Galimard. .

External links 

The Theatre's website

Theatres in Paris
Opera houses in Paris
Buildings and structures in the 2nd arrondissement of Paris
Theatres completed in 1855
Music venues completed in 1855